ZSS may refer to:

Zero speed switch
Zhenghua Secondary School, a secondary school in Bukit Panjang, Singapore
ZSS-FM, a radio station in Nassau, Bahamas
ZSS, the IATA airport code for Sassandra Airport, Côte d'Ivoire